Wow 1987-2004 is a Spanish language rock and roll greatest hits album by Mexican band Fobia. This is Fobia's first recording of any type since 1997's Fobia on Ice. This anthology compiles Fobia's greatest hits from their first five albums Fobia (1990), Mundo Feliz (1991), Leche (1993), Amor Chiquito (1995), and Fobia on Ice (1997), along with two new songs.

Original members Leonardo de Lozanne (voice), Paco Huidobro (guitar), Cha! (bass), and Iñaki (keyboards) returned, along with new drummer Jay de la Cueva and recorded two new singles: "" and "". It represents their come back from a long pause of the group, the members took a brake pursuing new projects and joined to record this album.

Track listing
 ""
 "" (from Amor Chiquito)
 ""
 "" (from Mundo Feliz)
 "" (from Leche)
 "" (from Fobia)
 "" (from Mundo Feliz)
 "" (from Amor Chiquito)
 "" (from Mundo Feliz)
 "" (from Fobia)
 "" (from Amor Chiquito)
 "" (from Fobia)
 "" (from Fobia)
 "" (from Leche)
 "" (from Amor Chiquito)
 "" (Queen cover)
 "" (from Amor Chiquito)
 "" (from Fobia)

Fobia albums
2004 compilation albums